Chevalier Quixote Jackson (November 4, 1865 – August 16, 1958) was an American pioneer in laryngology. He is sometimes known as the "father of endoscopy", although Philipp Bozzini (1773–1809) is also often given this sobriquet. Chevalier Q. Jackson extracted over 2000 swallowed foreign bodies from patients. The collection is currently on display at the Mütter Museum in Philadelphia.

Biography
Jackson was born in Pittsburgh, Pennsylvania. He went to school at the Western University of Pennsylvania (now the University of Pittsburgh) from 1879 to 1883, and received his MD from Jefferson Medical College in Philadelphia. He also studied laryngology in England.

His work reduced the risks involved in a tracheotomy. He essentially invented the modern science of endoscopy of the upper airway and esophagus, using hollow tubes with illumination (esophagoscopes and bronchoscopes). He developed methods for removing foreign bodies from the esophagus and the airway with great safety — a huge advance for a condition that previously had often been a death sentence, with a high mortality from the object itself or from complications of chest surgery in the 19th century.

Jackson campaigned to put labels on all poisonous or corrosive substances to prevent ingestion accidents.  Accordingly, the US Congress passed the Federal Caustic Poison Act of 1927, which has saved countless children from serious injury and death. He was awarded the Franklin Institute's Elliott Cresson Medal in 1929. Jackson authored four monographs, twelve textbooks, and over 400 medical articles. Jackson was a professor at six different schools, including the University of Pittsburgh, Jefferson Medical College, Woman's Medical College of Pennsylvania (now Drexel University College of Medicine) and Temple University.

Jackson married in 1899 and had a son, Chevalier Lawrence Jackson, known informally as "C.L.," who went on to become a professor at Temple University.  He resided at Sunrise Mill.

When Jackson died in Philadelphia, his obituary referred to him as "one of the greatest, if not the greatest laryngologists of all time."  He is buried in West Laurel Hill Cemetery, Bala Cynwyd, Pennsylvania.

Legacy
A collection of his papers is held at the National Library of Medicine
 His property Sunrise Mill was added to the National Register of Historic Places in 1977.

References

Cappello, Mary. Swallow: Foreign Bodies, Their Ingestion, Inspiration, and the Curious Doctor Who Extracted Them (NY: The New Press, 2010) 
Jackson, C.  The Life of Chevalier Jackson: An Autobiography, The Macmillan Company, New York, 1938
"Down the Hatch and Straight Into Medical History" New York Times, January 11, 2011

External links
 
 
Chevalier Jackson at WhoNamedIt.com
Biography-West Laurel Hill Cemetery web site

1865 births
1958 deaths
American otolaryngologists
Burials at West Laurel Hill Cemetery
University of Pittsburgh alumni
People from Pittsburgh
Physicians from Pennsylvania
Thomas Jefferson University alumni